Reggae Lions are a Maartener association football club based in Philipsburg. The team plays in the SMSA Senior League, the top tier of football on the island.

Reggae Lions are the defending Maartener champions, winning the 2016–17 SMSA Senior League season.

Honors 
SMSA Senior League
Champions: (1) 2016–17

References 

Football clubs in Sint Maarten